Richard Simkin (1850–1926) was a British artist and illustrator of military uniforms.

Biography
Born in Herne Bay, Kent, on 5 November 1850, the son of a commercial traveller, also named Richard. He spent much of his time at Aldershot, Hampshire, after marrying his wife, Harriet, in 1880, and may also have been a volunteer in the Artists Rifles. He was employed by the War Office to design recruiting posters, and to illustrate the Army and Navy Gazette. In 1901 he created a series of 'Types of the Indian Army' for the Gazette.; he obtained much of the information from the Colonial and India Exhibition of 1886. During his lifetime, he, along with Orlando Norie produced thousands of watercolours depicting the uniforms and campaigns of the British Army. Simkin also contributed illustrations to numerous publications including the Boy's Own Magazine, The Graphic and others; many were published by Raphael Tuck and sons.

He died at his home at 7 Cavendish Street, Herne Bay on 25 June 1926, survived by his wife and two daughters. Today, his pictures can be seen in numerous regimental museums and his illustrations appear in regimental histories, while watercolours frequently come up for auction.

Publications
 The War in Egypt. London: George Routledge, 1883
 Our Soldiers and Sailors in Egypt. London: George Routledge, 1885
 Uniforms of the British Army, in Twelve Representative Plates. London: Halford Bros, 1886
 Military Types. London: George Berridge, 1888–1902
 Life in the Army. London: Chapman & Hall, 1889
 A Book of Soldiers. London: Perry., c. 1890
 Following the Drum. London: William Allen, c. 1890
 Where Glory Calls. The Soldier's Scrap Book. London: William Allen, c. 1890
 The Royal Military Tournament. London: Frederick Warne, c. 1890
 The Boy's Books of British Battles from 1704 to 1882. London: George Routledge, c. 1890
 Our Armies. London: Sampson Low, Marston, 1891
 British Soldiers Past and Present: Their Dress and Equipment from 1600 to Date. London: Frederick Warne, c. 1894
 Armed Europe. London: Raphael Tuck, c. 1895
 The Army. London: George Routledge, c. 1900
 The Great Powers of the World. London: Dean, c. 1900
 Soldiers of the Queen. London: Thomas Nelson, c. 1900
 Soldiers of the Century. London: Dean, 1901
 Sailors of the Century. London: Dean, 1901

Gallery

References

Further reading
 Carman, William Y. (1982). Richard Simkin's uniforms of the British Army: the cavalry regiments: from the collection of Captain K.J. Douglas-Morris, RN. Exeter: Webb & Bower. 
 Carman, William Y. (1985). Richard Simkin's uniforms of the British Army: Infantry, Royal Artillery, Royal Engineers and other corps: from the collection of Captain K.J. Douglas-Morris, RN. Exeter: Webb & Bower. 
 Robinson, George. Richard Simkin: A Collection of Prints and Related Correspondence. Edinburgh: G. Robison, 1970. 2 vols.  
 Walton, Peter S. (1981). Simkin's soldiers: the British army in 1890. 2v. Dorking, Surrey: Victorian Military Society.

External links

 
Anne S. K. Brown Military Collection, Brown University Library over 350 original water-colours by Simkin

1850 births
1926 deaths
British illustrators
British war artists
19th-century war artists